Condylomitra is a genus of sea snails, marine gastropod mollusks in the family Mitridae.

Species
Species within the genus Condylomitra include:
 Condylomitra bernhardina (Röding, 1798)
 Condylomitra tuberosa (Reeve, 1845)

References

External links
 Fedosov A., Puillandre N., Herrmann M., Kantor Yu., Oliverio M., Dgebuadze P., Modica M.V. & Bouchet P. (2018). The collapse of Mitra: molecular systematics and morphology of the Mitridae (Gastropoda: Neogastropoda). Zoological Journal of the Linnean Society. 183(2): 253-337

Mitridae
Gastropod genera